Ababeel1 shortcut "A1" (Arabic: أبابيل1) the first Palestinian reconnaissance unmanned aerial vehicle (UAV), armed drone, made in Gaza by al-Qassam Brigades Industries, the military wing of the Islamic Resistance Movement (Hamas).

Types
 A1A reconnaissance aircraft
 A1B with attacking-throwing tasks
 A1C with attacking-suicide tasks

Background
Mohamed Zouari, an aerospace engineer originally from Sfax, left Tunisia for Syria in 1991 in order to escape the wave of repression of the Islamic political party Ennahdha by the Zine El Abidine Ben Ali regime. With knowledge of aeronautics and the design of drones, He then joined the ranks of the Izz al-Din al-Qassam Brigades, Hamas' military wing, where he supervised its unmanned aircraft manufacturing program, ultimately leading to the development of Ababeel1.

The first battlefield use of the Ababeel1 was in the Gaza War of 2014.

See also
 Palestinian domestic weapons production
 Qassam rocket
 Yasin (RPG)

References
 

Aircraft manufactured in the State of Palestine
Palestinian military reconnaissance aircraft
Weapons of Palestine
2014 in the Gaza Strip
Palestinian inventions
Unmanned military aircraft